Berthold Auerbach (28 February 1812 – 8 February 1882) was a German poet and author. He was the founder of the German "tendency novel", in which fiction is used as a means of influencing public opinion on social, political, moral, and religious questions.

Biography 
Moses (Moyses) Baruch Auerbach was born in Nordstetten (now Horb am Neckar) in the Kingdom of Württemberg. He attended Eberhard-Ludwigs-Gymnasium. He was intended for the ministry, but after studying philosophy at Tübingen, Munich and Heidelberg, and becoming estranged from Jewish orthodoxy by the study of Spinoza, he devoted himself to literature. While a student in Heidelberg and under the pseudonym “Theobald Chauber,” he produced a Biography of Frederick the Great (1834–36).

Another early publication was entitled Das Judentum und die neueste Litteratur (Judaism and Recent Literature; 1836), and was to be followed by a series of novels taken from Jewish history. Of this intended series he actually published, with considerable success, Spinoza (1837) and Dichter und Kaufmann ("Poet and Merchant"; 1839), based on the life of Ephraim Kuh.)  His romance on the life of Spinoza adheres so closely to fact that it may be read with equal advantage as a novel or as a biography. In 1841, he created a translation of Spinoza's works. In 1842, he wrote Der gebildete Bürger ("The Educated Citizen"), an attempt to popularize philosophical subjects.

But real fame and popularity came to him after 1843, when he began to occupy himself with the life of the common people which forms the subject of his best-known works. That year he published Schwarzwälder Dorfgeschichten ("Black Forest Village Stories"; 1843) which was his first great success, widely translated, and expressing with a sympathetic realism the memories and scenes of youth. In his later books, of which Auf der Höhe (On the Heights; 1865) is perhaps the most characteristic, and certainly the most famous, he revealed an unrivaled insight into the soul of the southern German country folk, and especially of the peasants of the Black Forest and the Bavarian Alps. His descriptions are remarkable for their fresh realism, graceful style and humour. In addition to these qualities, his last books are marked by great subtlety of psychological analysis. Auf der Höhe was first published at Stuttgart in 1861, and has been translated into several languages.

Auerbach died at Cannes shortly before his 70th birthday. His life was uneventful, though embittered at the close by the growth of German anti-Semitism.

Selected works 

 Schwarzwälder Dorfgeschichten (Tales of Villages in the Black Forest; 1843)
 Barfüssele (1856)
 Edelweiss (1861)
 Joseph im Schnee (Joseph in the Snow; 1861)
 Auf der Höhe (On the Heights; 1865)
 Das Landhaus am Rhein (A Country House on the Rhein; 1869)
 Waldfried (1874) draws literary inspiration from German unity and the Franco-Prussian War
 Nach dreissig Jahren (1876)
 Der Forstmeister (1879)
 Brigitta (1880)
 Briefe an seinen Freund Jakob Auerbach (Letters to His Friend Jakob Auerbach; posthumous, with a preface by Friedrich Spielhagen, 2 vols., 1884)

Literature on Auerbach 
 Andreas W. Daum, Wissenschaftspopularisierung im 19. Jahrhundert: Bürgerliche Kultur, naturwissenschaftliche Bildung und die deutsche Öffentlichkeit, 1848–1914. Munich: Oldenbourg, 1998, .
 Jonathan Skolnik, "Writing Jewish History Between Gutzkow and Goethe: Auerbach's Spinoza" in Prooftexts: A Journal of Jewish Literary History (1999)
  This work in turn cites:
 Eugen Zabel, Berthold Auerbach (Berlin, 1882)
  This work in turn cites Zabel and:
 Eduard Lasker, Berthold Auerbach, ein Gedenkblatt (1882)
  This work in turn cites Zabel, Lasker and:
 Anton Bettelheim, B. Auerbach, der Mann, sein Werk (1907)

References

External links 
 
 
 

1812 births
1882 deaths
People from Horb am Neckar
People from the Kingdom of Württemberg
19th-century German Jews
German poets
Writers from Baden-Württemberg
Jewish novelists
Jewish poets
University of Tübingen alumni
Ludwig Maximilian University of Munich alumni
Heidelberg University alumni
German male poets
German male novelists
19th-century German poets
19th-century German novelists
19th-century German male writers
19th-century German writers
Spinoza scholars
Translators of Baruch Spinoza
People educated at Eberhard-Ludwigs-Gymnasium